Ecliptopera capitata is a moth of the family Geometridae. The species can be found in Europe.

The length of the forewings is 11–13 mm. The moths fly in two generations from May to August.

The larvae feed on touch-me-not balsam.

Notes
The flight season refers to the Belgium and The Netherlands. This may vary in other parts of the range.

External links

Lepidoptera of Belgium
Lepiforum.de
Vlindernet.nl 

Cidariini
Moths of Japan
Moths of Europe
Taxa named by Gottlieb August Wilhelm Herrich-Schäffer